USNS Capable (T-AGOS-16) was a Stalwart-class modified tactical auxiliary general ocean surveillance ship of the United States Navy in service from 1989 to 2004. In 2008, she was commissioned into service in the National Oceanic and Atmospheric Administration as the oceanographic research ship NOAAS Okeanos Explorer (R 337).

Construction

Capable was laid down by VT Halter Marine, Inc., at Moss Point, Mississippi, on 17 October 1987. She was launched on 28 October 1988 and delivered to the U.S. Navy on 9 June 1989.

U.S. Navy service

The U.S. Navy placed the ship upon delivery in non-commissioned service with the Military Sealift Command as the United States Naval Ship USNS Capable (T-AGOS-16). Designed to collect underwater acoustical data in support of anti-submarine warfare operations, Capable spent the final years of the Cold War towing Surveillance Towed Array Sensor System (SURTASS) sonar equipment to hunt for Soviet Navy submarines. She operated with a mixed crew of Navy personnel and civilian merchant mariners.

After the Cold War ended with the collapse of the Soviet Union in late December 1991, requirements for such surveillance declined. Later in the 1990s, Capables SURTASS gear was removed and she received an AN/SPS-40E radar for use in counternarcotics surveillance.

The Navy withdrew Capable from service on 14 September 2004. It struck her from the Naval Vessel Register and transferred her to the National Oceanic and Atmospheric Administration (NOAA) the same day.

References

External links
 
NavSource Online: Service Ship Photo Archive USNS Capable (T-AGOS-16) 
noaa.gov NOAA Ship Okeanos Explorer
TED Talks Robert Ballard: Exploring the ocean's hidden worlds (video) TED (conference) Filmed February 2008 Posted May 2008 18 minutes

 

Stalwart-class ocean surveillance ships
Cold War auxiliary ships of the United States
Ships built in Moss Point, Mississippi
1988 ships
Ships transferred from the United States Navy to the National Oceanic and Atmospheric Administration